The Max Planck Institute for Meteorology (Max-Planck-Institut für Meteorologie; MPI-M)  is an internationally renowned institute for climate research. Its mission is to understand Earth's changing climate. Founded in 1975, it is affiliated with the Max Planck Society and the University of Hamburg, and is based in Hamburg's district of Eimsbüttel. Its founding director was the Nobel laureate Klaus Hasselmann. The current managing director is Bjorn Stevens.

Organization and Research 

The MPI-M comprises two departments and hosts independent research groups. They also conduct work with national and international partners.

Departments:
 Atmosphere in the Earth System - investigates the weather and its effect on the climate
 Ocean in the Earth System - investigates how the ocean plays a part in the planet's climate

Independent research groups:
 CLICCS joint working group
 Minerva Fast Track Research Group
 Climate Vegetation Dynamics
 Environmental Modeling

Cooperative Work:
 the German national weather service
 CMIP6
 Max Planck Institute for Meteorology Grand Ensemble

International Max Planck Research School 
The Max Planck Institute for Meteorology and the University of Hamburg jointly run the International Max Planck Research School on Earth System Modelling (IMPRS-ESM) to promote high-quality doctoral research into the Earth's climate system. The school conducts research in four primary research areas: atmosphere, land, ocean, and the human dimension.

References

External links 
Home page
Research School

Meteorology
Meteorological research institutes
Organisations based in Hamburg
Buildings and structures in Eimsbüttel
University of Hamburg